Ivan Vasilyevich Zaplatin (January 21, 1872, Orenburg Governorate — after 1919) was a major (voyskovoy starshina) of Imperial Russian Army, a bakery butter producer, a deputy of the Second Imperial Duma from the Orenburg Governorate in 1907, who had "moderately progressive" political position. He was the founder of the Ural Union of butter-producing cooperatives (1910), that organized the export of Siberian and Ural butter to Europe. During the Kornilov affair in 1917, he was the commandant of the Tauride Palace and informed the Bolsheviks of the military actions of the Kornilov troops and commands of the headquarters of the Petrograd Military District.

Literature 
 Заплатин Иван Васильевич (in Russian) // Государственная дума Российской империи: 1906—1917 / Б. Ю. Иванов, А. А. Комзолова, И. С. Ряховская. — Москва: РОССПЭН, 2008. — P. 205. — 735 p. — .
 Члены Государственной Думы (портреты и биографии). Второй созыв. 1907—1912 гг. / Сост. М. М. Боиович. — Москва, 1907. — P. 213. (in Russian)
 Ганин А. В., Семёнов В. Г. Заплатин Иван Васильевич // Офицерский корпус Оренбургского казачьего войска. 1891—1945: Биографический справочник. — М.: Русский путь; Библиотека-фонд «Русское Зарубежье», 2007. — P. 230. — 676 с. — . (in Russian)
 Заплатин, Иван Васильевич (in Russian) // Челябинская область: энциклопедия / гл. ред. К. Н. Бочкарёв. — Челябинск: Каменный пояс, 2008. — Т. 2. — Д—И. — 672 с. — .

1872 births
Year of death missing
People from Chelyabinsk Oblast
People from Orenburg Governorate
Trudoviks
Members of the 2nd State Duma of the Russian Empire
Recipients of the Order of Saint Stanislaus (Russian), 3rd class